Kevin Stuhr Ellegaard (né Kevin Stuhr Larsen, born 23 May 1983) is a retired Danish professional footballer who played as a goalkeeper.

He has played for Manchester City and Blackpool in England, as well as German club Hertha BSC and Dutch club SC Heerenveen.

Ellegaard has played 56 games for various Danish youth selections, including 20 games for the Denmark U21 national team. He has been selected several times for the Denmark national team, but has not appeared in a match.

Club career
Born in Copenhagen, Ellegaard spent his youth years in various Zealand clubs. In July 2002 he moved from Farum BK to Manchester City. In the 2003–04 season, he made two full appearances and two substitute appearances for the club in the league, replacing David Seaman both times when coming on as a substitute. He was loaned out to Blackpool FC for a month in January 2005, where he played two league matches in Football League One. Stuhr-Ellegaard moved to Germany to play for Hertha BSC in summer 2005. He had a hard time forcing his way into the starting line-up, and only played two Bundesliga games for the team. He moved to Danish club Randers FC as a free agent in the summer 2007.

In his first half season with Randers, Ellegaard conceded only 15 goals in 18 matches. He went on to play all Randers games in his first two seasons with the club, helping Randers finish sixth in the 2007–08 and fifth in the 2008–09 Superliga season. In the 2009–10 Superliga season, Ellegaard conceded 15 goals in the first seven games, and was dropped from the starting line-up by coach John Jensen in August. As Randers' results did not improve with new goalkeeper Nathan Coe, Ellegaard was reinstated in October 2009, and conceded only eight goals in the 16-game unbeaten run that secured Randers FC another season in the top flight. Ellegaard and Randers decided to part their ways in June 2010, as they could not agree on a new contract.

In season 2010–11, Dutch club SC Heerenveen had big problems with their goalkeepers, so they decided that they needed to contract a new goalie for a short period. The first-keeper Brian Vandenbussche got injured during a training session, which left Heerenveen with only one goalie, Kenny Steppe. Heerenveen gave Ellegaard a trial at the club, which led to him signing a one-year contract. In the beginning, Heerenveen saw him as a second-keeper behind Steppe, but Ellegard impressed so much in training that the trainer Ron Jans made him first-choice. Despite Ellegard playing 28 matches and impressing both the audience and the trainers with his play, they decided not to renew his contract, because Vandenbussche was coming back from his injury.

On 23 January 2012, Ellegaard signed a three-year contract with Swedish club IF Elfsborg as a free agent.

On 24 January 2020, Ellegaard returned to Denmark and signed with Danish 2nd Division club FC Helsingør. He reached promotion to the Danish 1st Division in his first six months with the club. On 22 December 2021, 38-year old Ellegaard announced his retirement from football. However, on 2 May 2022, Ellegaard came out of retirement, when he signed a short-term contract with Danish Superliga club AaB for the rest of the season.

International career
Ellegaard made his debut for the Danish under-16 youth national team in September 1998, and went on to represent various youth national teams for a combined total of 56 games. He made his debut for the Denmark U21 national team in September 2004, and represented the team at the 2006 Under-21 European Championship tournament in May 2006.

While at Manchester City, Ellegaard served as a stand-in for Thomas Sørensen in the initial Denmark national team training sessions ahead of the 2004 European Championship. He was not a part of the Danish squad at the tournament. In the fall of 2007, while playing for Randers, Ellegaard was called up as the Danish third choice goalkeeper due to the injury of Jesper Christiansen. In August 2008, Ellegaard was called up for the national team again, due to a new Jesper Christiansen injury.

Career statistics

Honours
IF Elfsborg
 Allsvenskan: 2012
 Svenska cupen: 2014

Individual
 Randers FC Player of the year: 2007–08
 Eredivisie ING Fair Play-reward
Denmark's best penalty keeper – Recent statistics showed that out of 29 Danish keepers, Ellegaard is the best one in saving penalties, making him a penalty specialist. He is known for his "double save" in a penalty against AFC Ajax. He had a fantastic 45% rate in penalty saves, which made him the best Danish penalty keeper.

References

External links
 
 Danish Superliga statistics 

1983 births
Living people
Danish men's footballers
Denmark youth international footballers
Denmark under-21 international footballers
Association football goalkeepers
Hvidovre IF players
Manchester City F.C. players
Hertha BSC players
Hertha BSC II players
Randers FC players
SC Heerenveen players
IF Elfsborg players
FC Helsingør players
AaB Fodbold players
Premier League players
English Football League players
Footballers from Copenhagen
Danish Superliga players
Bundesliga players
Eredivisie players
Allsvenskan players
Danish 1st Division players
Danish expatriate men's footballers
Danish expatriate sportspeople in England
Danish expatriate sportspeople in Germany
Danish expatriate sportspeople in the Netherlands
Expatriate footballers in England
Expatriate footballers in Germany
Expatriate footballers in the Netherlands